Maine North High School (officially was known as Maine Township High School North) was a public four–year high school in Des Plaines, Illinois, United States, located northwest of Chicago. Maine North was located in unincorporated Maine Township, part of Maine Township High School District 207 which includes Maine East, Maine West, and Maine South High Schools. Maine North served parts of Des Plaines, Glenview, and Niles. Opened in August 1970, Maine North closed in May 1981. The building is constructed in brutalist style, and its architect was Donald Stillwaugh.

History
As student population declined, the decision came down to closing Maine East or Maine North. Maine East, the oldest school in the district, opened in 1929, but also had considerable numbers of alumni and students with the S.O.S. (Save Our School) campaign pushing to keep it open. On November 17, 1980, the school board voted, 4–3, to close Maine North by the following year, citing that it was not only the smallest school, but the least centrally located of the schools in the district. In October, the board voted to close the school at the end of the 1980–1981 school year. The building was subsequently sold along with the District's administrative building, which had its offices relocated to Maine South High School.

Later uses 
After its closing, Maine North was used for location shooting of the 1985 movie The Breakfast Club, filmed in the spring of 1984. The library scenes in the movie were shot in the school gymnasium, where a set was constructed.  A plaque downstairs in the building commemorates the movie being shot there.

The school was also used as a training facility for the Chicago Blitz of the short-lived United States Football League and was renamed Blitz Park by head coach George Allen. It also later served as a mortuary college. In 1986, the school's interior was featured in another movie, Ferris Bueller's Day Off.

Today

References

External links 
 Maine Township High School District 207
 Notable Alumni: Rickards Family story

Des Plaines, Illinois
Educational institutions established in 1970
Educational institutions disestablished in 1981
Former high schools in Illinois
Public high schools in Cook County, Illinois